Jaroslav Navrátil is a Czech footballer who plays as a right winger for Kisvárda FC in the Hungarian Nemzeti Bajnokság I. He formerly played for the Dutch teams Heracles Almelo and Go Ahead Eagles.

Career statistics
.

References

External links
 
 

1991 births
Living people
Czech footballers
Association football forwards
Eredivisie players
Eerste Divisie players
Heracles Almelo players
Go Ahead Eagles players
Kisvárda FC players
Nemzeti Bajnokság I players
Czech expatriate footballers
Expatriate footballers in the Netherlands
Expatriate footballers in Hungary
Czech expatriate sportspeople in Hungary
Czech expatriate sportspeople in the Netherlands
People from Hustopeče
Sportspeople from the South Moravian Region